Erixson is a surname. Notable people with the surname include:

Irma Erixson (born 1937), Swedish actress, daughter of Sven
Sven Erixson (1899–1970), Swedish painter and sculptor

See also
Erikson